Jack Miller may refer to:

Military
 Jack Miller (USMC officer) (1920–1942), American marine soldier
 Jack Duppa-Miller (1903–1994), British recipient of the George Cross in World War II, originally called Jack Miller
 USS Jack Miller, an American warship

Racing
 Jack Miller (motorcyclist) (born 1995), Australian Grand Prix motorcycle racer
 Jack Miller (racing driver) (born 1961), American racing driver

Sports figures
 Jack Miller III (born 2002), American football quarterback
 Jack Miller (alpine skier) (born 1965), American former alpine skier
 Jack Miller (athlete) (1899–1957), Canadian Olympic athlete
 Jack Miller (footballer) (1875–1949), English footballer, who played for Wolverhampton Wanderers and Stoke
 Jack Miller (ice hockey) (1925–2004), professional ice hockey player who played with the Chicago Blackhawks
 Jack Miller (rugby league, born 1906) (1906–1978), rugby league footballer for Great Britain, England, and Warrington
 Jack Miller (rugby league, born 1994) (born 1994), rugby league footballer for Huddersfield, Doncaster and Keighley
 Jack Miller (sportscaster), Canadian sportscaster and politician

Others
 Jack Miller (pastor) (1928–1996), American pastor and author
 Jack Miller (politician) (1916–1994), Republican United States Senator from Iowa
 Jack Miller (writer) (fl. 1930s), American writer in animation, see Hamateur Night and The Early Worm Gets the Bird
 Jack Miller, a character in the 90s sitcom The Nanny, played by Spalding Gray
 The defendant in the American Supreme Court case United States v. Miller

See also
 John Miller (disambiguation)
 Jack Millar, winner of the Golden Harp

Miller, Jack